Robert Desiderio (born September 9, 1951) is an American actor best known for his roles on television.

Life and career
Desiderio was born in 
The Bronx, the son of Mary (née Demattia) and Anthony J. Desiderio. He and actress Judith Light married in 1985. They have no children.

Desiderio first came to prominence in soap operas, appearing in daytime dramas such as Search for Tomorrow (1979–80), Ryan's Hope (1982) and One Life to Live (1982–83). In 1986–1987, he starred in the short-lived ABC primetime drama series Heart of the City. From 1988 to 1989 he had the recurring role of Ted Melcher in the CBS primetime soap opera, Knots Landing. Desiderio also had recurring roles on MacGruder and Loud, Cheers and The Sopranos, and guest-starred in The A-Team, Remington Steele, The Fall Guy,  Matlock, Family Ties, Murder, She Wrote, Murphy Brown and Ugly Betty. He appeared in a number of made for television movies, include The Princess and the Cabbie and Once You Meet a Stranger. In 1996, he appeared alongside his wife in the documentary Paul Monette: The Brink of Summer's End. Desiderio co-wrote the 2007 film Save Me starring Chad Allen and his wife Judith Light.

Filmography

References

External links
 

1951 births
American male soap opera actors
American male television actors
Male actors from New York City
Living people
20th-century American male actors
21st-century American male actors
American people of Italian descent